Harris is a township in the Timiskaming District in the Canadian province of Ontario.

Harris is located directly east of the city of Temiskaming Shores on the northern shore of Lake Timiskaming. The township had a population of 523 in the Canada 2011 Census. The township's main settlement is the community of Sutton Bay.

Demographics 

Mother tongue (2006):
 English as first language: 59%
 French as first language: 39%
 English and French as first language: 0%
 Other as first language: 2%

See also
List of townships in Ontario
List of francophone communities in Ontario

References

Municipalities in Timiskaming District
Single-tier municipalities in Ontario
Township municipalities in Ontario